is a passenger railway station located in the city of Sōka, Saitama, Japan, operated by the private railway operator Tōbu Railway. It is one stop away from the border between Tokyo and Saitama Prefecture.

Line
Sōka Station is served by the Tōbu Skytree Line, and is 17.5 kilometers from the Tokyo terminus of the line at Asakusa Station.

Station layout
The station has two elevated island platforms with four tracks abutting the platforms, going in opposite directions. The station building is located underneath the platforms. Tracks one and six are used by non-stop trains and are not served by platforms, so the platform numbering starts with platform 2.

Platforms

Adjacent stations

History
The station opened on 27 August 1899. It was rebuilt as an elevated station, completed on 9 August 1988.

From 17 March 2012, station numbering was introduced on all Tōbu lines, with Sōka Station becoming "TS-16".

Passenger statistics
In fiscal 2019, the station was used by an average of 88,682 passengers daily.

Surrounding area
Sōka City Hall
Sōka Post Office

See also
 List of railway stations in Japan

References

External links

  

Railway stations in Japan opened in 1899
Tobu Skytree Line
Stations of Tobu Railway
Railway stations in Saitama Prefecture
Sōka